Trona High School is a public high school in Trona, California, United States.

Football Field
Trona's football field is all-dirt and is known as "The Pit". The high school maintenance crew keeps the field free of stones and they regularly drag the field to keep the surface from getting too hard. The field is watered on game day and leveled to ensure that the playing surface is safe for all participants.

Until several years ago an annual game was played against Boron High School. Referred to as the Borax Bowl by some, the game was a matchup of two mining towns that are world leaders in producing potash and borax, minerals used in a number of products.

References

Public high schools in California
High schools in San Bernardino County, California